Dehiwala East Grama Niladhari Division is a Grama Niladhari Division of the Dehiwala Divisional Secretariat of Colombo District of Western Province, Sri Lanka. It has Grama Niladhari Division Code 540.

National Zoological Gardens of Sri Lanka, Sri Subodharama Raja Maha Vihara and Christ Church, Galkissa are located within, nearby or associated with Dehiwala East.

Dehiwala East is a surrounded by the Udyanaya, Malwatta, Jayathilaka, Dehiwala West and Galwala Grama Niladhari Divisions.

Demographics

Ethnicity 

The Dehiwala East Grama Niladhari Division has a Sinhalese majority (52.6%), a significant Moor population (23.0%) and a significant Sri Lankan Tamil population (20.9%). In comparison, the Dehiwala Divisional Secretariat (which contains the Dehiwala East Grama Niladhari Division) has a Sinhalese majority (60.5%), a significant Moor population (20.8%) and a significant Sri Lankan Tamil population (14.5%)

Religion 

The Dehiwala East Grama Niladhari Division has a Buddhist plurality (46.7%), a significant Muslim population (24.0%) and a significant Hindu population (17.0%). In comparison, the Dehiwala Divisional Secretariat (which contains the Dehiwala East Grama Niladhari Division) has a Buddhist majority (54.3%), a significant Muslim population (22.6%) and a significant Hindu population (12.1%)

Gallery

References 

Colombo District
Grama Niladhari divisions of Sri Lanka